Adrian Politowski  (born October 1978) is a BAFTA-nominated Swedish film producer, financier, and entrepreneur. He co-founded and was CEO of Umedia (formerly Motion Investment Group) from 2004 to 2019. He currently is the CEO of the production and financing group Align that he co-founded. His career is focused on three areas: 

 Film & TV production (with over 400 projects credited as producer) 
 Finance (with over $630M raised and deployed in media financing) 
 Entrepreneurship as a founder as well as board of director member of Goodbye Kansas Group (listed at NASDAQ First North) and the health-tech startup Nordic Executive Medicine.

He has produced and financed films such as the Academy Awards winner The Artist (2011), Good Luck to You, Leo Grande (2022) (Four-time nominated at BAFTA and premiered at Sundance Film 2022), Grace of Monaco (2014) starring Nicole Kidman, (Official Selection and opening film of the 2014 Cannes Film Festival), Mandy (2018) starring Nicolas Cage that premiered on Sundance Film Festival 2018, Paws of Fury: The Legend of Hank (2022) starring Samuel L Jackson, Michael Cera and Ricky Gervais, animation feature Le Petit Nicolas (2022). that premièred as the Official Selection at Cannes Film Festival 2022, won the Cristal Award at Annecy Animation Film Festival, and was nominated for an Annie Award for Best Independent Feature Film and The Pod Generation (2023) starring Emilia Clarke and Chiwetel Ejofor and premiered in Sundance Film Festival (2023). He also produced the HBO TV series My Brilliant Friend.

Personal life 
Politowski was born in Stockholm, Sweden. His birth name is Murshid, and he is of Polish and Bangladeshi descent. On the paternal side, he is the grandson of Nurjahan Murshid and Khan Sarwar Murshid. On the maternal side, he is the grandson of Mieczyslaw Politowski.

Politowski attended  Oxford University / Somerville College from 1996, receiving a Master of Engineering in 2000. Staying on at University of Oxford (St. Peter's College), he obtained his second Master's aged 23 - a Master of Philosophy in Economics in 2002. 

Politowski married fellow producer Nadia Khamlichi. Together with his ex-wife, they have one son, born 2012. Adrian is currently with Swedish model/influencer Amanda Gyllensparv. He "currently splits his time between Los Angeles, Brussels and Stockholm".

Career 
Politowski and his partners Nadia Khamlichi (his ex-wife) and Jeremy Burdek founded Motion Investment Group in 2004 in Brussels, Belgium. In 2010, the group rebranded as Umedia (formerly stylized uMedia), with business divisions of "uFund (fundraising), uFilm (production and investment), uDream (distribution) and uFX (visual effects)."

In 2019, Politowski and Khamlichi co-founded and launched the production company Align Pictures, resigned as CEO and sold his remaining stake in Umedia in 2020.

At his departure from Umedia, the group had grown into a $100M+ turnover international production group with 200 staff. From 2004 onto 2020, it had raised and financed over $630M, produced over 400films and its VFX division has grown into the largest in Benelux.

Politowski is currently on the Board of Directors of the gaming/VFX company and tech group Goodbye Kansas since 2022 (publicly traded on NASDAQ First North), is a member of the Advisory Board of WIFTI (Women in Film and TV International)  and is Chairman of Nordic Executive Medicine.

Selected filmography

References

External links 
 

Swedish film producers
1978 births
Living people